The London Lesbian Film Festival is an annual film festival in London, Ontario, which presents an annual program of lesbian-interest films. The only exclusively lesbian-oriented film festival in North America, the event has been staged by the Reeling Spinsters organization since 1991.

See also 
 List of LGBT film festivals
 List of film festivals in Canada
 List of women's film festivals

References

External links

Lesbian culture in Canada
Lesbian events
LGBT film festivals in Canada
Festivals in London, Ontario
Film festivals in Ontario
Women's film festivals in Canada
Film festivals established in 1991
LGBT in Ontario
Women in Ontario